Cycling competitions at the 2011 Pan American Games in Guadalajara was held from October 15 to October 22 at the Pan American Velodrome (Track), Guadalajara Circuit (Road), Pan American Mountain Bike Circuit in Tapalpa and CODE San Nicolás (BMX).

Medal summary

Road cycling

Track cycling

Mountain biking

BMX

Schedule
All times are Central Daylight Time (UTC−5).

Qualification

Quota Places

References

 
Events at the 2011 Pan American Games
2011 in cycle racing
2011 in BMX
International cycle races hosted by Mexico
2011